The Jane Donalson Harrell House, located near the Chattahoochee River on County Route 1975 about  south of U.S. 84 in Jakin, Georgia, was built around 1855.  It was listed on the National Register of Historic Places in 1982.

It is a two-story Plantation Plain-style house with Greek Revival features.

References

Plantation Plain architecture
National Register of Historic Places in Early County, Georgia
Houses completed in 1855